Club Sport Marítimo Sub-23 is a Portuguese football club that currently plays in the Campeonato Nacional de Sub-23. They are the second reserve team of Club Sport Marítimo.

External links
ZeroZero.pt profile

C.S. Marítimo
Maritimo
Sport in Madeira
Association football clubs established in 2012
1999 establishments in Portugal